The Hill River is a  tributary of the Lost River of western Minnesota in the United States.  Via the Lost River, the Clearwater River, the Red Lake River, the Red River of the North, Lake Winnipeg, and the Nelson River, it is part of the Hudson Bay watershed.

Hill River was so named for the morainic hills in the area.

See also
List of rivers of Minnesota

References

Minnesota Watersheds
USGS Hydrologic Unit Map - State of Minnesota (1974)

Rivers of Clearwater County, Minnesota
Rivers of Polk County, Minnesota
Rivers of Red Lake County, Minnesota
Rivers of Minnesota
Tributaries of Hudson Bay